The 1980 Pot Black event was a professional invitational snooker tournament, which was held at the Pebble Mill Studios in Birmingham. The tournament began with eight players competing in two groups of four using a round-robin format. The matches were one-frame shoot-outs in the group stages, two-frame aggregate scores in the semi-finals, and best-of-three-frames in the final.

Broadcast on BBC2, the programmes started at 21:00 on Friday 4 January 1980. Alan Weeks presented the programme with Ted Lowe as commentator and Sydney Lee as referee.

The first programme of the series featured reigning Pot Black champion Ray Reardon playing against the then world champion Terry Griffiths making his Pot Black debut. Reardon reached the final where he lost 1–2 to Eddie Charlton who himself won his third title equalling the record set by John Spencer.

Main draw

Group 1

Group 2

Knockout stage

References

Pot Black
1980 in snooker
1980 in English sport